Metatomarctus is an extinct genus of  the Borophaginae subfamily of canids native to North America. It lived during the Early to Middle Miocene, 23–16 Mya, existing for approximately  It was an intermediate-size canid, and more predaceous than earlier borophagines.

It hunted in packs, like modern canines, and may have preyed upon creatures such as Equus, rodents, and other smaller prey.

Fossil distribution
Thomas Farm Site, Gilchrist County, Florida, estimated age ~23.3—16.3 Mya. 
Pollack Farm Site, Kent County, Delaware.
Hackberry Wash, San Bernardino County, California.
Rattlesnake Hills, Fremont County, Wyoming.
High Rock Canyon aka UCMP V-110, Humboldt County, Nevada.
Ahren's Prospect, Elder Ridge, and Pebble Creek, Runningwater Formation, Dawes County, Nebraska.
 Other fossil locations: Maryland, Wyoming, New Mexico, western Nebraska.

References

Borophagines
Miocene canids
Neogene mammals of North America
Prehistoric carnivoran genera